Vasudevanallur is a town panchayat located 37 km from Tenkasi District in the Indian state of Tamil Nadu. It is located under the Western Ghats

Geography
It has an average elevation of 178 metres (583 feet).

 Nearest Railway Station Name : Sankarankovil - This Railway Station Located 20 km Distance from this village.
 Nearest Airport Located in : Madurai
 Bus Route Details : : Kollam to Thirumangalam

Demographics
 India census, Vasudevanallur had a population of 18,461. Males constituted 49% of the population and females 51%. Vasudevanallur had an average literacy rate of 62%, higher than the national average of 59.5%: male literacy was 74%, and female literacy was 51%. In Vasudevanallur, 10% of the population was under 6 years of age.

It is a suburb of Vasudevanallur (Assembly constituency) and Tenkasi Lok Sabha constituency, with an area of 10.40 km2. It has 18 wards and 93 streets.

As of the 2011 census, the county had 5833 households and a population of 21361.

Economy
As sugarcane grows well in Vasudevanallur and its surroundings, a sugarcane mill operates in Vasudevanallur as a private sector.As well as this region is rich for growth of lemon.

Transportation

The Madurai - Sengottai Highway has buses for Madurai, Tenkasi, Rajapalayam, Sankarankoil and  chennai, pondicherry,Bangalore,Trupati,Trichi

Politics
Vasudevanallur (state assembly constituency) (SC) is part of Tenkasi (Lok Sabha constituency).

References

Cities and towns in Tirunelveli district